"Te Felicito" (English: "I Congratulate You") is a song by Colombian singer-songwriter Shakira and Puerto Rican singer Rauw Alejandro. The song was released on 21 April 2022 as the lead single from Shakira's upcoming twelfth studio album. It is her first Spanish-language song since "Me Gusta" in early 2020.

Background and release 
On 9 April 2022, a tweet appeared on Shakira's Twitter account, stating "Te felicito que bien actúas" ("I congratulate you on acting well"). The tweet was deleted soon afterwards, but it led to speculation on social media about who the tweet was aimed at. The following week, the appearance of a white robot on the thumbnails of six of Shakira's videos caused further speculation. On 14 April 2022, Shakira posted the cover of the single, featuring her dressed in the white robot costume, on her Instagram account, announcing its release on 22 April 2022.

Recording and composition 
Colombian songwriter Keityn confirmed in an interview with Puerto Rican radio host Molusco that he had composed "Te Felicito" before he even met Shakira. He later offered the song to her in 2021 and worked on the song together.

Music video 
The video was released simultaneously with the song one day before the planned release due to a leak of the song. It was directed by long-time collaborator Jaume de Laiguana and has a futuristic theme. The video features Shakira dancing against pink and purple backgrounds. She does the robot dance throughout the video. At times she is actually joined by a white robot dancing next to her. Shakira then repairs and activates a robot played by Rauw Alejandro. They both sing and dance, with the white robot and Rauw Alejandro alternating as Shakira's dance partner. About halfway through the video, Shakira lights a green fire and begins to dance alone while surrounded by flames. Shakira and Rauw Alejandro strike a pose as the song ends. Just as the video fades to black, Shakira can be seen making kissing gestures toward the camera.

Commercial performance
In the United States, "Te Felicito" topped the Billboard Latin Airplay chart with an audience impression of 10.52 million, extending Shakira's record as the female artist with the most number ones on the chart. The song also topped the Latin Pop Airplay, and Latin Rhythm Airplay. The song also peaked at number 10 on Hot Latin Songs chart. The song debuted at 88 on US Hot 100, becoming Shakira's 23rd and Rauw's fifth entry, later peaking at number 67.

The song was successful throughout Latin America, reaching the top 10 on all charts it entered, and topping numerous airplay charts, including Argentina, Colombia, Costa Rica, El Salvador, Peru and Uruguay. "Te Felicito" also became Shakira's first number-one single on the Billboard Argentina Hot 100, which was launched in October 2018.

"Te Felicito" peaked at number four on the Russian airplay chart. In Europe, the song peaked at number two in Spain, where the song was certified quadruple platinum by Promusicae for selling 240,000 units in the country. In Switzerland, the song debuted at number 88 on the week ending June 19 and reached number 71.

Globally, the song peaked at number 11 on Billboard Global 200 chart, while peaking at number six on the Billboard Global 200 Excl. US. The song became Shakira's second top 100 entry on the Global 200 and her first top 10. It also became her second top 30 and first top 10 on the Excl. US chart.

"Te Felicito" was the 15th most streamed song in summer 2022 on Spotify globally.

Reception 
American news website BuzzFeed News named "Te Felicito" as one of the "26 Songs That Defined 2022" stating that "it feels like Colombian pop star Shakira doesn’t rest, and never misses." Latina placed the song at number 2 on its list of the Top 20 Songs of 2022 by Latina Artists stating that "the Colombian icon seemingly and masterfully channeled that heartbreak into one of the year’s most cutting kiss-off anthems. Like Rihanna in 'Take a Bow,' Shakira compared an ex-lover to an actor who played a part during their relationship. Shakira got her groove back". Billboard magazine named "Te Felicito" as one of the 17 Biggest Song Collaborations of 2022.

Charts

Weekly charts

Monthly charts

Year-end charts

Certifications

Awards and nominations

See also
List of Billboard Hot Latin Songs and Latin Airplay number ones of 2022
List of best-selling singles in Spain

References 

Songs written by Shakira
2022 songs
2022 singles
Shakira songs
Songs written by Rauw Alejandro
Rauw Alejandro songs